The Lebombo flat lizard (Platysaurus lebomboensis) is a species of lizard in the family Cordylidae.

Geography
The Lebombo flat lizard lives in southern Africa, including Transvaal, Swaziland, and KwaZulu-Natal, a province in South Africa. This area includes Middle Lebombo Range.

The habitat of this small lizard include grasslands and thickets.

Description
Lebombo flat lizards are closely related to a subspecies of Platysaurus intermedius, P. i. wilhelmi. Females, males, and juveniles of the Lebombo flat lizard are black-brown-gray, with blue bellies  and white spots and stripes on their backs.

References

External links
 More Information

Platysaurus
Reptiles of Eswatini
Reptiles described in 1994
Lizards of Africa
Reptiles of South Africa
Taxa named by Neils Henning Gunther Jacobsen